Estadio Centenario is a stadium in the Parque Batlle of Montevideo, Uruguay, used primarily for football. The stadium was built between 1929 and 1930 to host the inaugural 1930 FIFA World Cup, as well as to commemorate the centenary of Uruguay's first constitution. It is listed by FIFA as one of the football world's classic stadiums. On July 18, 1983, it was declared by FIFA as the first Historical Monument of World Football, to this day the only building to achieve this recognition worldwide.

Estadio Centenario is the national stadium of Uruguay and the primary home of their national football team. Uruguay has always been a threat when playing in their home stadium, consistently beating top teams. Even the top ranked Brazil national football team has only managed three wins in 20 attempts; two were official matches during 2010 and 2018 World Cup qualification, but one was Uruguay's heaviest defeat at the stadium, when they lost 4–0 to Brazil in 2009.

History 
The construction of the Centenario is one of the most important stages in the development of sports in South America and international football. It was built especially for the 1930 FIFA World Cup, by immigrant workers in a record time of nine months. Its name originates from the 100-year-celebration of the ratification of the first Constitution of Uruguay.

Initially, all World Cup matches were to be played in the Centenario. However, heavy rains in Montevideo delayed construction of the stadium, so that several matches had to be played in the Pocitos Stadium of Club Atlético Peñarol, and the Parque Central of Club Nacional de Football. It was inaugurated on July 18, 1930, with a match between Uruguay and Peru; the Celeste won 1–0 with a goal by Hector "Manco" Castro.

The final match of the inaugural World Cup matched Uruguay and Argentina, with Uruguay winning 4–2. Since then, the Centenario has been the scene of Copa América (1942, 1956, 1967, 1995), three South American Youth Championships (1979, 2003, 2015), a South American Under-17 Football Championship (1999) and 1980 Mundialito.

In 2021, the Centenario was selected as host of the Copa Libertadores and Copa Sudamericana finals. The stadium was renovated to prepare for those matches. The total cost of the works was $6 million, and included the renovation of the grandstands, bathrooms, VIP boxes, and press boxes, along with a new illumination system and new pitch.

Tenants 

Aside from the Uruguay national team, any football club can rent the stadium for its home matches. Peñarol has done that often, and Nacional rents it for some international matches. Peñarol played all of its home matches at the stadium from 1933 until it moved to Estadio Campeón del Siglo in 2016.

In the case of other Uruguayan teams, they often decide to play there against both Peñarol and Nacional.

Grandstands 
The stadium has four Grandstand separated by four lanes. The main one is the Olympic Tribune (and lower Platea known as Olympic), which is named so because the team had won two Olympic championships in a row (1924 and 1928). This has a maximum capacity of 21,648 spectators located in the three rings and the audience. Then there are the "popular", so called because they are sold cheaper, these are: the Colombes, in honor of the Colombes, France in which the national team became Olympic champions 1924 and Amsterdam, because it was where the Celeste were crowned Olympic champions for the second time in 1928. The Grandstand Colombes accommodates 13,914 spectators while the Amsterdam accommodates 13,923. The America Tribune is parallel to the Olympic one. There are also "VIP" boxes and press boxes with room for 1,882 spectators, as well as the platform has room for 2,911 spectators, and additionally the grandstand has room for 5,957 people.

Under the Olympic Grandstand are located primary school "Nº 100 Héctor Fígoli"; and the Museum of Uruguayan Football. Under the Colombes Grandstand is located Police Station Nº9.

Concerts 
The stadium has held numerous concerts by both national and international artists such as:

 Aerosmith
 Amaral
 Árbol
 Arnaldo Antunes
 Attaque 77
 Brian May
 Bryan Adams
 Buitres Después de la Una
 Charly García
 Chayanne
 Enrique Iglesias
 Eric Clapton
 Fito Páez
 Guns N' Roses
 Joaquín Sabina
 Joe Cocker
 Joe Vasconcellos
 Jorge Drexler
 Los Olimareños
 Los Piojos
 Luciano Pavarotti
 Luis Miguel
 Maná
 No Te Va Gustar
 Nortec Collective
 One Direction
 Patricio Rey y sus Redonditos de Ricota
 Paul McCartney
 Phil Collins
 Plácido Domingo
 ReyToro
 Ricardo Arjona
 Rod Stewart
 Roger Waters
 Roxette
 Rubén Blades
 Sebastian Bach
 Serú Girán
 Soledad Pastorutti
 Soy Luna Live
 Sting
 Sui Generis
 The Rolling Stones
 Tini
 Teen Angels
 The Cult

1930 FIFA World Cup 
Estadio Centenario hosted ten matches of the 1930 FIFA World Cup, including both semi-final matches and the final match.

Copa Libertadores and Copa Sudamericana Final 
It hosted the final of the Copa Sudamericana on 20 November 2021 and the Copa Libertadores on 27 November 2021.

References

External links 

Estadio Centenario in Gigapan
Estadio Centenario

1930 establishments in Uruguay
Sports venues completed in 1930
1930 FIFA World Cup stadiums
Centenario
Sport in Montevideo
Buildings and structures in Montevideo
National stadiums
Copa América stadiums
Museums in Montevideo
Music venues completed in 1930
Articles containing video clips